Cyperus aureoalatus is a species of sedge that has been found to occur in Somalia, Uganda and Ethiopia.

The species was first formally described by the botanist Kåre Arnstein Lye in 1995.

See also
 List of Cyperus species

References

aureoalatus
Plants described in 1995
Flora of Somalia
Flora of Uganda
Flora of Ethiopia
Taxa named by Kåre Arnstein Lye